Gilchrist is an unincorporated community in Farmington Township, Fulton County, Illinois, United States. Gilchrist is south of Farmington.

References

Unincorporated communities in Fulton County, Illinois
Unincorporated communities in Illinois